Hampstead is a civil parish in Queens County, New Brunswick, Canada.

For governance purposes it is divided between CFB Gagetown and the local service district of Hampstead, which is a member of Regional Service Commission 11 (RSC11). The Saint John River islands are not part of the local service district.

Origin of name
The parish was probably named for Hempstead, New York, source of some of the Loyalist settlers of the parish.

History
Hampstead was erected in 1786 as one of the county's original parishes.

In 1838 the rear of the parish was included in the newly erected Petersville Parish.

In 1895 the eastern half of Long Island was transferred to Wickham Parish.

New Brunswick's last surviving African Canadian community, Elm Hill, was established here in 1806.

Boundaries
Hampstead  Parish is bounded

on the east by the Saint John River;
on the southeast by the Kings County line;
on the southwest and northwest within CFB Gagetown by a line at the end of Olinville Road and running along Yorkshire Road to the northwestern line of a grant to John Short, east of the junction with the road to Vincent, then northeasterly and northwesterly along grants belonging to Sylvanus Haviland, James Corbett, and Henry Appleby to the Lawfield Road, then northeasterly along Lawfield Road to the southernmost corner of a grant to Thomas T. Hewlett at the corner of Kerr Road, meeting a line running south 52º west, from the southwestern corner of a grant to Nathaniel Jarvis, then following the line out of CFB Gagetown;
on the north by the southern line of the Jarvis grant, part of which forms the southern boundary of the village of Gagetown;
including Spoon Island, Upper Musquash Island, and the western half of Long Island.

Communities
Communities at least partly within the parish; bold indicates an incorporated municipality; italics indicate a community expropriated for CFB Gagetown

 Central Hampstead
 Dunns Corner
 Elm Hill
 Hamilton Mountain
 Hampstead
 Hibernia
 Inchby
 Lower Gagetown
 McAlpines
 New Jerusalem
 Pleasant Villa
 Quarries
 Queenstown
 Summer Hill

Bodies of water
Bodies of water at least partly in the parish:

 Little River
 Saint John River
 Lawson Passage
 Palmer Creek
 Fanning Lake
 Rabbit Lake
 Long Island Lake
 Otnabog Lake

Islands
Islands in the parish:
 Long Island
 Spoon Island
 Upper Musquash Island

Other notable places
Parks, historic sites, and other noteworthy places in the parish.
 CFB Gagetown

Demographics

Population
Population trend, 2021

Language
Mother tongue language (2021)2021

Access Routes
Highways and numbered routes that run through the parish, including external routes that start or finish at the parish limits:

Highways
none

Principal Routes
None

Secondary Routes:

External Routes:
None

See also
List of parishes in New Brunswick

Notes

References

Parishes of Queens County, New Brunswick